Nehme is a prominent Lebanese surname which is derived from the given name Nehme. As of 2014, Nehme is the 39th most common surname in Lebanon with about 13,000 people holding the surname, or about one in 380 people.

Etymology and history
The name derives from the Arabic word for “blessing” or “grace”.

The Nehme family is believed to stem from the Daou family tree with one of its sons, Nehme Daou, as the father of all Nehme families within the Levant. Lehfed, a small village near Byblos in the Byblos district of modern-day Lebanon, is believed to be the ancestral home of the Nehme family.

As Mount Lebanon was an area of continuous civil unrest at the end of the 19th century, many Nehme families were forced to flee to nearby towns, including the city of Deir el Qamar, while others ventured further south to reach the city of Haifa and beyond.

The surname Nehme is most prominent within Christian families in the north of Lebanon; Shia, Sunni, and Druze families in the country also share the surname. For example, a Shia branch of the family tree is also present in the south of Lebanon, specifically in the town of Mahrouna.

Variations
Because of the challenges facing transliteration, many variations of Nehme exist such as Naameh, Nemeh, Neme, Nimah and Naama.

There are other Nehme families in the Middle East which may not be related to the Lebanese branch, for example in Iraq, Iran, Jordan, Qatar and the United Arab Emirates, who usually have the "Al-" or "Abu" prefix, such as Al-Neama or Abu Nimah.

Notable people

Nehme
 Abeer Nehme (born 1980), Lebanese singer and musicologist
 Abraham Nehmé (1927–2022), Archbishop of the Melkite Greek Catholic Archeparchy of Homs
 Adel Nima (born 1970), Iraqi football coach and former player
 Angelo Nehme (born 2004), Danish footballer
 Ghassan Nehme (born 1995), Lebanese basketball player
 Laïla Nehmé (born 1966), Lebanese-French archaeologist
 Lina Murr Nehmé (born 1955), French-Lebanese author and professor
 Raoul Nehme (born 1956), Lebanese minister of economy and trade
 Rodrigo Nehme (born 1982), Mexican actor
 Stephen Nehmé (1889–1938), Lebanese Maronite professed religious from the Lebanese Maronite Order
 Tania Nehme (born 1966), Australian film editor
 Safaa Ali Nema (born 1959), Iraqi wrestler

Abu-Nehme
 Hasan Abu Nimah (born 1935), Jordanian ambassador
 Ali Abunimah (born 1971), Palestinian-American journalist

Al-Nehme
 Ahmad Alenemeh (born 1982), Iranian association football player

See also
Nehme (given name), an Arabic given name

References

Arabic-language surnames
Lebanese families